Thomas Richman Blackshear II (born November 14, 1955) is an African-American artist, many of whose paintings adorn Evangelical churches. He is also a sculptor and a designer of ornaments, often of African American themes.

Early life 
Blackshear was born in Waco, Texas. He grew up in Atlanta, Georgia.

Blackshear attended the Art Institute of Chicago and then American Academy of Art in Chicago.

Blackshear worked for Hallmark Cards for one year after his 1977 graduation from the American Academy of Art.

Career 
Blackshear designed illustrations for numerous postage stamps issued by the United States Postal Service (USPS).

 Black Heritage series, initiated in 1978:
<li> Jean Baptiste Point du Sable – 22¢ – issued February 20, 1987
<li> James W. Johnson – 22¢ – issued February 2, 1988
<li> Asa Philip Randolph – 25¢ – issued February 3, 1989
<li> Ida B. Wells – 25¢ – issued February 1, 1990
<li> Dorothy Height – 49¢ (Forever stamp) – issued February 2, 2017—in conjunction with Lateef Mangum 
 Single:
<li> Joe Louis – 29¢ – issued June 22, 1993
 
<li> Eubie Blake
<li> Jelly Roll Morton
<li> James P. Johnson
<li> Erroll Garner
<li> Thelonious Monk
<li> Coleman Hawkins
<li> Charlie Parker
<li> John Coltrane
<li> Louis Armstrong
<li> Charles Mingus

 
<li> The Wizard of Oz
<li> Gone with the Wind
<li> Stagecoach
<li> Beau Geste
 
<li> Bela Lugosi as Dracula
<li> Lon Chaney as The Phantom of the Opera
<li> Lon Chaney, Jr., as The Wolf Man
<li> Boris Karloff as The Mummy
<li> Boris Karloff as Frankenstein's monster
 Stars of stage and screen
<li> James Cagney – single – 33¢ – issued July 22, 1999 (designed by Howard Paine, illustrated by Blackshear)
 Literary Arts:
<li> James Baldwin – single – 37¢ – issued June 24, 2004
 Nobel Peace Prize / humanitarian
<li> Mother Teresa – issued September 5, 2010

Blackshear also created video game box art, including for Karateka (1984).

A touring exhibit of his Black Heritage works premiered in 1992 at the Smithsonian Institution's National Museum of American History. Blackshear also illustrated the USPS book I Have A Dream: A Collection of Black Americans on U.S. Postage Stamps (1991). Multiple pieces of Blackshear's artwork serve as the cover art for American rock band The Killers's sixth studio album Imploding the Mirage (2020) and its singles. Blackshear's original oil paintings in the Western Nouveau genre similar to “Dance of the Wind and Storm” and the other pieces used for The Killers's album can be found at the Broadmoor Galleries in Colorado Springs.

Works and publications

Awards and honors 
2020 Society of Illustrators Hall of Fame

References

Further reading 
. The article is illustrated with Blackshear's artwork.

External links
 
 The Premiere Community of Thomas Blackshear Enthusiasts
 Thomas Blackshear's Gallery
 Blackshear at United States Postal Service
 Thomas Blackshear on the African American Visual Artists Database
Broadmoor Galleries, Colorado Springs, CO showing Thomas Blackshear's Western Nouveau Original Oil Paintings

1955 births
Living people
People from Waco, Texas
American stamp designers
20th-century American painters
American male painters
21st-century American painters
21st-century American male artists
Hallmark Cards artists
Album-cover and concert-poster artists
20th-century African-American painters
21st-century African-American artists
20th-century American male artists